Mount Hunt ( is located in the Teton Range, Grand Teton National Park in the U.S. state of Wyoming. The peak is situated near the head of Open Canyon and just west of Mount Hunt Divide. The peak was named after William Price Hunt, one of the leaders of the 1811-12 Astor Expedition.

References

Mountains of Grand Teton National Park
Mountains of Wyoming
Mountains of Teton County, Wyoming